The 2010 Western Carolina Catamounts team represented Western Carolina University as a member of the Southern Conference (SoCon) during the 2010 NCAA Division I FCS football season. Led by third-year head coach Dennis Wagner, the Catamounts compiled an overall record of 2–9 with a mark of 1–7 in conference play, tying for eighth place in the SoCon. Western Carolina played their home games at Bob Waters Field at E. J. Whitmire Stadium in Cullowhee, North Carolina.

Schedule

References

Western Carolina
Western Carolina Catamounts football seasons
Western Carolina Catamounts football